Constitution of 1924 may refer to:

1924 Soviet Constitution
Turkish Constitution of 1924